Constantin "Dinu" Cocea (22 September 1929 – 26 December 2013) was a Romanian actor, film director and screenwriter.

Biography
Dinu Cocea was born in Periș, into a well-known theatrical family; his relatives included N. D. Cocea, Alice Cocéa, and Dina Cocea. He completed his secondary studies at the Gheorghe Lazăr High School and then studied at the Institute of Theatre and Cinematographic Art in Bucharest, graduating in 1953.

In 1985 he emigrated to France. Cocea died from heart failure on 26 December 2013, aged 84, in Paris. He was survived by his daughter, Oana.

Filmography

As director
 Haiducii (1966) 
  (1968) 
  (1968) 
 Haiducii lui Șaptecai (1971) 
  (1971) 
  (1971)
  (1972) 
  – TV series (1972) 
  (1974)
 Nu opriți ventilatorul (1976)
 Lanțul neglijențelor (1976)
 Instanța amână pronunțarea (1976) 
  (1978)
  (1980) 
  (1981)

References

External links

1929 births
2013 deaths
People from Periș
Gheorghe Lazăr National College (Bucharest) alumni
Caragiale National University of Theatre and Film alumni
Romanian film directors
Romanian male film actors
Romanian screenwriters
20th-century Romanian male actors
Romanian expatriates in France